The first-seeds Jack Hawkes and Gerald Patterson successfully defended their title by defeating Ian McInnes and Pat O'Hara Wood 8–6, 6–1, 6–2 in the final, to win the men's doubles tennis title at the 1927 Australian Championships.

Seeds

  Jack Hawkes /  Gerald Patterson (champions)
  Jack Crawford /  Jim Willard (semifinals)
  Ian McInnes /  Pat O'Hara Wood (final)
  Tim Fitchett /  Rupert Wertheim (quarterfinals)

Draw

Finals

Earlier rounds

Section 1

Section 2

Notes

 Some sources give 6–2 as a result of the third set.
 Also spelled T. Grinstead.

References

External links
Source for seedings

1927 in Australian tennis
Men's Doubles